Brief, briefs, or briefing may refer to:

Documents
 A letter
 A briefing note
 Papal brief, a papal letter less formal than a bull, sealed with the pope's signet ring or stamped with the device borne on this ring
 Design brief, a type of educational or business document including desires and requirements
 Creative brief, a document used by creative professionals and agencies to develop creative deliverables
 Brief (architecture), a type of educational or business document including desires and requirements
 Brief (law), a number of formal document types

Computing
 Brief (text editor), a popular text editor for the MS-DOS operating system

Entertainment
 Dr. Briefs, a fictional character in the Dragon Ball manga and anime series
 The Briefs, a Seattle band
 Brief, a fictional character in the Panty & Stocking with Garterbelt anime

Other
 Brief, a garden in Sri Lanka designed by Landscape Architect Bevis Bawa
 Briefs, a type of underwear and swimwear
 The Briefing, evangelical Christian magazine
 The Briefing: Politics, the Press, and the President, a 2018 memoir by Trump Administration press secretary Sean Spicer
 Behavior Rating Inventory of Executive Function (BRIEF), a behavioral assessment for children and adolescents

See also
 Brief intervention, a technique used to address alcohol abuse
 Brief therapy, an umbrella term for psychotherapy approaches
 Watching brief, an archaeological recording method
 Debriefing